The National College, Trichy is an autonomous institution, located in Tiruchirappalli, Tamil Nadu. It has been recognized as the 'College with Potential for Excellence' by the University Grants Commission in 2011.

Management 

President

Padmavibushan Dr.Krishnamurthy
President of Dr.V.krishnamurthy educational foundation, 
Chancellor, Indian Maritime University, Uthandi, Chennai.
Chancellor, Central University of Tamilnadu, Tiruvarur.

Former Positions as Chairman
I.I.M. Bangalore, I.I.M. Ahamadabad, I.I.T. New Delhi, Xavier Institute of Management, Bhubaneshwar

Former Positions as Chairman and CEO
Bharat Heavy Electricals Ltd, Steel Authority of India Ltd, Maruti Udyog Ltd

Secretary

Mr. K. Raghunathan Born on the 9th of March 1941 to late Dr.R.Kalamegham and K.Kamala at kumbakonam, Mr.K.Raghunathan did his B.Sc (Chem) at Jamal and then his B.L at Madras Law College and started practice in 1966.

Posts Held
Past President Rotary Club of Tiruchirapalli, Rock Town Jaycees. Founder Preseident of Trichy Dist Advocates Association, Life Patron: Trichy District Cricket Association – Institution reached new heights during his tenure

In 2004, when National College Council was trifurcated. He was elected as Secretary of Dr V Krishnamurthy Educational Foundation.

History
The National College was founded in 1919 under the affiliation of University of Madras. Honourable Prime Minister Shri. Narendra Modi, in his virtual address at the Centenary Celebrations of Visva Bharati University, Shantiniketan, West Bengal, called for the students to evolve into individuals with Self-sufficiency (Athma Nirbar) with the knowledge they have. Stating that many educational institutions have served for India's bright future (Ujval Bhavi Bharath), our Honorouble Prime Minister Nadrendra modi also highlighted those 100-year-old educational institutions play a prominent role in Nation-building wherein he mentioned prominent few such as Visva Bharathi University, Banaras Hindu University, Aligarh Muslim University, Mysore University, National College, Trichy , Mahatma Gandhi Kashi Vidyapith, and Gujarat Vidyapith. These colleges and Universities were established he said during the British rule and continue to serve the student community by imparting knowledge appropriate to transform India into a self-reliant Nation. Recently the college comensed its centenary year were as vice president of India M. Venkaiah Naidu inaugurated the centenary celebration, and Prominent visitors to the college include Mahatma Gandhi, Jawaharlal Nehru, Rajaji, Annadurai, as well as alumnus, R. Venkataraman, who went on to become President of India.

Academic Programmes
The college offers undergraduates and postgraduate programmes in arts and science affiliated to the Bharathidasan University. It has been accredited by NAAC with an A+ Grade (CGPA 3.61). Academic programs include Tamil and English Literature, Hindi, Sanskrit, Geology, Mathematics, Physics, Chemistry, Commerce, Management, Statistics, Economics, Philosophy, Botany, Zoology and History.

References

External links
National College website

Universities and colleges in Tiruchirappalli
Educational institutions established in 1919
1919 establishments in India
Colleges affiliated to Bharathidasan University
Academic institutions formerly affiliated with the University of Madras